Wesam Al-Sowayed (born 29 November 1987) is a Saudi Arabian professional footballer who plays for Al-Jubail as a left back. He has played for the Saudi Arabia national team.

References

External links 
 

Living people
1987 births
Sportspeople from Jeddah
Saudi Arabian footballers
Ittihad FC players
Al-Faisaly FC players
Al-Ansar FC (Medina) players
Al-Hazem F.C. players
Al-Kawkab FC players
Al-Orobah FC players
Al-Jubail Club players
Saudi First Division League players
Saudi Professional League players
Saudi Third Division players
Association football fullbacks